David Garza (pronounced Dah-veed; born February 4, 1971) is a Grammy winning Los Angeles based singer-songwriter, multi-instrumentalist, producer, composer, and visual artist.

Biography
A third-generation Mexican-American and Dallas-area native David Garza came to Austin in the fall of 1989 to attend the  University of Texas. With his first band, The Happy Farmers, he opened shows for such Dallas Deep Ellum faves of the era as the New Bohemians, Ten Hands, and Fever in the Funkhouse at Club Dada. But by age 18, he won a classical guitar scholarship to the University of Texas at Austin. Garza had met Austinites Chris Searles and Jeff Haley through scholastic music events in high school. They christened themselves Twang Twang Shock-A-Boom and headed to the West Mall of the UT campus, armed with acoustic guitar, upright bass and bongos.

The acoustic three-piece band “went from playing the West Mall on the University of Texas campus for fun and tips to packing a thousand or so fans into Liberty Lunch and showcasing at the headquarters of CBS Records (now Sony Music)”.

After leaving the group Twang Twang Shock A Boom to go solo, Garza formed a new band and gigged continually around and outside the Texas area, billed as David Garza & The Lovebeads and later as DAH-VEED. In the mid-1990s he had his brush with the major-label world, signing with Lava/Atlantic, but eventually returned to his street-performer roots, releasing nearly an album a year since.

Garza released a flurry of solo cassettes and CDs, selling them for $5 and $10, respectively. He called this the “Single Bill Theory,” one he maintains to the present day. Garza performed tirelessly on the regional club and college circuit, ultimately striking a major-label deal, in 1996. Initially, Garza rebuffed various major label recording offers, choosing instead to record and distribute music on his own label, Wide Open Records. After independently releasing nine records and selling 30,000 copies on his own, he eventually signed with Lava/Atlantic and was featured on the Great Expectations soundtrack. His major-label debut, This Euphoria, followed in April 1998.

He took over production duties for his second Lava/Atlantic record, 2001's Overdub, and brought in Will Calhoun and Doug Wimbish, the drummer and bassist of Living Colour as his backup band for the sessions.  Juliana Hatfield contributed backing vocals on the song "Keep On Crying."

In 1999, at the height of his touring popularity, Garza was voted 2nd behind Stevie Ray Vaughan as Austin Musician of the Decade (Austin Chronicle).

In 2011, the City of Austin, TX declared May 12 “David Garza Day.” Soon after, to celebrate what would've been Elliott Smith's 44th birthday on August 6, 2013, Smith’s family entrusted Garza to “host a bicoastal tribute to the late pop mystic.”

In subsequent years, Garza has returned to releasing his music independently and plays frequently in Texas and in Los Angeles. A series of residency shows at L.A.'s Club Largo showcased his skill as a solo performer on both piano and guitar. During Garza's live shows, artists as highly regarded as producer/soundtrack icon Jon Brion, Nickel Creek, Grant Lee Phillips and Fiona Apple regularly sat in with him. Garza has shared the stage with the likes of Jackson Browne, John Paul Jones, Los Lobos, Pearl Jam, St. Vincent, Meshell Ndegeocello, Andrew Bird, Natalia LaFourcade, Chris Thile, Ben Harper. He has also done extensive work as a producer and session musician, composer, and visual artist.

In 2020 he was a musician on, co-produced and created the album artwork for the 2-time Grammy award winning Fiona Apple release Fetch The Bolt Cutters.

Collaborations
Throughout his career, David Garza has done studio and live session work for a number of artists. He contributed guitar and production to Juliana Hatfield's Beautiful Creature in 2000, and toured as keyboardist for Alejandro Escovedo in 2001.  The same year, he played on the soundtrack for the film Spy Kids.

In 2002, he worked with Rhett Miller on The Instigator, and in 2004 he appeared on Hanson's record Underneath. In 2005, he toured with Fiona Apple on her Extraordinary Machine tour, performing both as the opening act and as a guitarist in her backing band.

In 2006, Garza played baritone guitar on the Revolting Cocks Cocked and Loaded LP, and Al Jourgensen later added vocals to “Minority Boys Got $” on Garza’s 2008 album Dream Delay.

Garza played guitar and sang back-up vocals on the 2007 John Legend single “Sun Comes Up”.

Since 2008, Garza has regularly toured and recorded with Gaby Moreno.

David performed the music on comedian, actress, and singer-songwriter Marget Cho’s 2016 album American Myth.

In 2020, Garza was a guest vocalist and piano player on the Watkins Family Hour studio album entitled Brother Sister, joining Gaby Moreno and John C. Reilly on a cover of Charley Jordan’s "Keep It Clean".

Composing and production 
Garza contributed music on film scores for Wretches & Jabberers (2011), Garnet’s Gold (2014) and Racing Extinction (2015).

In 2016, Garza produced Nina Diaz (of Girl in a Coma) first solo record The Beat is Dead.

In 2019, Garza composed the original score for the HBO film Running with Beto 

In 2020, Garza co-produced, played multiple instruments on and made the album artwork for Fiona Apple's Fetch The Bolt Cutters

Discography 
Just Say Love (1991)
Summer Songs 1 (1991)
Summer Songs 2 (1992)
Eyes Wide Open (1992)
Culture Vulture (1993)
Conmigo (1994)
Blind Hips In Motion (1995)
1000 Copies (1996)
4-Track Manifesto EP (1997)
This Euphoria (1998)
Kingdom Come and Go (1999)
Summer Songs 3 (2000)
Overdub (2001)
Alarm/Alarm Spring (2002)
Summer Songs 4 (2002)
Secret Album (2003)
Amorea (2003)
Covers/Colcha (2003)
Summer Songs 5 (2003)
A Strange Mess of Flowers (box set) (2004)
Oh Dread EP (download) (2005)
May Ides EP (download)(2005)
Chuy Chuy Yall EP (download) (2005)
Summer Songs 6 (2005)
Sound of Music EP (download) (2005)
David Garza (2005 Tour CD) (2005)
Slaughterhouse Jive (download)(2008)
filmusic  (download) (2008)
Dream Delay (2008)
Summer Songs 7 (2009)
AD HOC (2009)
Dream Demos (2009)
The Road To ACL (2010)
Oversea (2011)
Sleep (2012)
Human Tattoo (2013)
Ballad of Crybear (2016)
Lost Rhyme (2019)

Notes

External links
David Garza official site
David Garza on Myspace

David Garza Profile on RollingStone.com

1971 births
Living people
Musicians from Austin, Texas
People from Irving, Texas
American male singer-songwriters
American musicians of Mexican descent
Hispanic and Latino American musicians
University of Texas at Austin alumni
Singer-songwriters from Texas
21st-century American singers
21st-century American male singers
Lava Records artists
Atlantic Records artists